The Western Antique Aeroplane and Automobile Museum (WAAAM) is located in Hood River, Oregon, United States, adjacent to the Ken Jernstedt Memorial Airport. WAAAM is a nonprofit 501(c)(3) organization committed to the preservation of, and education about aviation, automobile, and other historic transportation-related relics.

WAAAM is open to the public every day 9:00-5:00 except Thanksgiving, Christmas, and New Years. WAAAM has special activities the second Saturday of every month. The museum features flying demonstrations, auto demonstrations, and restoration demonstrations, though events vary month to month. The museum's biggest event is the annual Hood River Fly-In held the first weekend after Labor Day every year, and features antique aircraft and automobiles from throughout North America.

History
The museum was formed as a 501(c) organization in 2006, by collector Terry Brandt and opened in 2007, in a  building.  The museum was started with 42 airplanes donated by Brandt and 20 automobiles. As of September 2010, the museum totaled 75 airplanes and in excess of 100 automobiles. About 55 of the airplanes were still able to fly at that time. In 2009, a second hangar was added to display the collection, and a third was built in 2013. A fourth addition was added November 2016. The collection in 2016 totals over 315 vehicles.

Collections

Antique airplanes
WAAAM boasts a large flying collection of OX-5-powered airplanes, and the largest collection of three-cylinder, radial-powered airplanes. The collection is mainly focused on aircraft in the period 1903–1941, but also includes light World War II Army, Army Air Corps, and naval aircraft.

Aircraft include:

 Cutiss headless pusher- 1912
 Curtiss JN-4D "Jenny" OX-5 N1282 - 1917
 Waco 9 - 1925
 Stearman C2 - 1927
 American Eagle A-1 OX-5 NC7157A  - 1928
 Boeing 40C N5339
 Lincoln Page LP-3 OX-5 NC136W - 1928
 Monocoupe 70 - 1928
 Stearman C3B Wright J-5 NC8830 - 1928
 Swallow - 1928
 Travel Air 4000 - 1928
 WACO ATO "Taper Wing" N6714 -1928
 WACO Ten OX-5 NC6513 - 1928
 Ford Trimotor - 1929
 Arrow Sport Pursuit N853H - 1929
 Brunner-Winkle Bird OX-5 - 1929
 Brunner-Winkle Bird A NC945V - 1929
 Brunner-Winkle Bird CK  NC933V - 1929 
 Command-Aire 3C3-T OX-5- 1929
 Curtiss Robin B  N8332 OX-5 - 1929
 St. Louis C2 Cardinal N31H -1929 
 Stearman M-2 Speedmail - 1929 
 WACO CTO "Taper Wing" -1929 
 WACO CSO Wright J-6  -1929
 WACO DSO N605N - 1929
 Davis D-1-K - 1929. NC151Y. This aircraft appeared in the 1958 film The Tarnished Angels starring Rock Hudson, Robert Stack, Dorothy Malone.
 Fleet Model 7 -1930
 Henderson Longster N10115 - 1930
 WACO Primary Glider - 1930
 Aeronca C-3 -1931
 American Eagle Eaglet B-31 N595Y - 1931
 Buhl Bull Pup LA-1 NC365Y - 1931
 Curtiss-Wright Junior CW-1 NC671V - 1931
 Curtiss-Wright Travel Air 12-W N11715 - 1931
 Franklin Sport 90 - 1931
 Spartan C2-60 N11016 - 1931
 Stinson model W - 1931
 Stearman 4 Jr. Speedmail - 1931
 Taylor Cub E-2 -1931
 WACO RNF - 1931
 Aeronca C-3 N13000 - 1932
 Fairchild 22 C7B NC12454 - 1932
 Pietenpol Sky Scout N1933A  - 1932
 Waco UBA - 1932
 WACO UBF -1932
 Fairchild 22 C7A N2816 -1933
 Stearman Model 70 N571Y -1933
 Waco UIC - 1933
 Curtiss Pusher -1934 (1910-replica) OX-5
 Franklin PS-2 Glider - 1935
 WACO YPF - 1935
 Arrow Model F NC17093 - 1936
 Stinson SR-8B Reliant - 1936
 Taylor J-2 Cub -1936
 Aeronca LC NC17442 - 1937
 Mcclish Funk B - 1937
 Rearwin 9000-W "Sportster" -1937
 Aeronca K KCA "Chief" - 1938
 Dart G - 1938, N20993. This aircraft also appeared in The Tarnished Angels.
 Piper J-3 Cub 1st Edition - 1938
 Piper J-3P Cub  - 1938
 Rearwin 6000-M "Speedster" -1938
 Taylor J-3 Cub First Edition -1938
 Taylorcraft BC-65 -1938
 Porterfield CP-50 Collegiate - 1939
 Slingsby T.6 Kirby Kite - 1939
 Slingsby T.13 Petrel -1939
 Cessna C-165 Airmaster - 1940
 Fairchild (24) R40) UC-86 NC4841 - 1940 military variant 
 Naval Aircraft Factory N3N Navy training floatplane N45042 - 1940
 Piper J-3 Cub -1940
 Piper J-3 Cub on Floats -1940
 Piper J-4A - 1940
 Piper J-5A - 1940
 Rearwin 8135 Cloudster - 1940
 Boeing-Stearman IB75A N57444 - 1941 *not currently on display*
 Aeronca 65-TAL Defender - 1941
 Culver LCA Cadet NC34785 - 1941
 Piper J-4 Cub Coupe NC21867 - 1941
 Ryan PT-22 Recruit - 1941
 Taylorcraft BC-12 NC29840 - 1941
 Piper L-4A - 1942
 Schweizer TG-3 - 1942 Last known flying example of its kind
 Stinson L-5 Sentinel - 1942
 Taylorcraft TG-6 Glider - 1942
 Aeronca L-3B - 1942
 Cessna UC-78 Bobcat N58542 - 1943
 Fairchild PT-19 N56268 - 1943 On loan 
 Interstate L-6 - 1943 
 Moswey III Glider - 1943 
 Piper HE-1 - 1943 
 Taylorcraft L-2M Grasshopper N3072Z - 1943
 Aeronca 7AC Champion -1945 On loan 
 Piper L-4J - 1945
 Commonwealth Skyranger 185 -1946 
 Piper TG-8
 Luscombe 11A Sedan -1948 
 Boeing-Stearman PT-17 Kaydet - 1946
 Alfaro PTG-2 Primary Glider
 Bowlus Baby Albatross BA-100 - 1948
 Aeronca 15AC Sedan - 1951 
 Dittmar Condor IV - 1951
 Beechcraft Super 18D N18BY - 1954 (on loan)
 Callair A-6 - 1959
 American Junior Target Drone - 1941-1945 (on loan) 
 Oberlerchner Mg 23 SL Glider -1963
 Schleicher Ka7 Glider - 1964
 Schweizer SGS 2-33A - 1969
 Cessna U206G Stationair - 1978
 Schleicher Rhönbussard 35

WAAAM is a living museum with several aircraft that are flown regularly, also a number of these aircraft are on loan and are frequently taken to fly-ins.

Other notable aircraft not on display but in the WAAAM Collection:

 Dickenson Bathtub 101 - 1924
 Waco GXE - 1927
 Waco BSO - 1929
 Stinson Model R -1932

Antique automobiles

WAAAM's antique cars were built between 1909 and the 1960s, and are still in running condition. There are over 175 autos on display. Most are from the 1920s, 1930s, and 1940s. The oldest car on display is a 1909 Franklin Model D.

Automobiles include:

 American Austin Coupe 1930
 Auburn Touring Car 1912
 Autocar Truck 1925
 Avanti Motor Corp Avanti II 1981
 Brush Runabout 1910
 Buick 4-door Sedan 1929
 Buick Super Eight 4-door Sedan 1941
 Cadillac Eldorado Biarritz 1956
 Chevrolet Model 490 Touring Car 1918
 Chevrolet Model 490 Touring Car 1921
 Chevrolet "Outlaw" Dirt Track Racer 1927
 Chevrolet Imperial Landau Sedan "Barn Find" 1927
 Chevrolet 2-door Sedan 1931
 Chevrolet Phaeton 1931
 Chevrolet Master Deluxe 1937
 Chevrolet Master Deluxe Business Coupe 1941
 Chevrolet Town Sedan 1942
 Chevrolet Tank Truck 1953
 Chevrolet Custom Pickup Truck 1954
 Chevrolet Bel Air 1957
 Chevrolet Cameo Pickup Truck 1957
 Chevrolet Bel Air 1964
 Chevrolet Corvette Sting Ray 1966
 Chevrolet Corvette Sting Ray Convertible 1966
 Chevrolet Custom Pickup Truck 1969
 Chrysler Model E-80 Imperial Cabriolet 1927
 Chrysler Model 65 Coupe 1929
 Chrysler New Yorker 1948
 Citroen DS 1971
 Cord 810 Westchester Sedan 1936
 Crosley Model CD Sedan 1950
 DeSoto (automobile) Model CF Deluxe 4-door Sedan 1930
 DeSoto Deluxe 4-door Sedan 1948
 Detroit Electric Car Model 63 1914
 Diamond T Flatbed Truck 1949
 Dodge Flatbed Fire Truck 1932
 Dodge WF-34 Flatbed Truck 1947
 Dodge C-800 Truck 1966
 Dodge Charger R/T 1968
 Dodge Brothers Roadster 1916
 Dodge Brothers Coupe 1926
 Dodge Brothers Victory 6 Deluxe Sedan 1928
 Federal Flatbed Truck 1917
 Ford Model T Touring Car 1913
 Ford Model T Depot Hack 1914
 Ford Model T Touring Car 1914
 Ford Model T Runabout 1915
 Ford Model T Army Ambulance 1919
 Ford Model T Quick Build Car 1919
 Ford Model T Speedster 1919
 Ford Model T Roadster Pickup Truck 1921
 Ford Model T 3-door Sedan 1923
 Ford Model T Pickup Truck 1925
 Ford Model T Roadster Runabout 1925
 Ford Model TT Truck 1925
 Ford Model T Coupe 1926
 Ford Model T Sport Roadster 1927
 Ford Model T Speedster 1927
 Ford Model TT Truck 1924
 Ford Model TT Truck 1925
 Ford Model A 2-door Sedan 1928
 Ford Model A Deluxe Coupe 1930
 Ford Model A Standard Coupe 1930
 Ford Model A Standard Coupe 1930
 Ford Model A Standard Sedan 1930
 Ford Model A Deluxe 2-door Sedan 1931
 Ford Model A Roadster 1931
 Ford Deluxe 4-Door Sedan 1940
 Ford Deluxe Business Coupe 1940
 Ford Thunderbird 1956
 Ford Thunderbird Convertible 1962
 Ford Thunderbird 1966
 Ford Thunderbird Town Landau 1966
 Franklin Model D 1909
 Franklin Model 135 135 1929
 Graham-Paige Model 612 1929
 HMV Freeway 1981
 Honda N600 2-door Sedan 1972
 Hudson Super 8 1930
 Hudson Terraplane 3-passenger Coupe 1937
 Hudson Hornet 1951
 Hummer 1997
 International Model SPD Truck 1926
 Hupmobile Model R-12 Touring Car 1924
 Jensen Interceptor  MkIII 1976
 Jensen-Healey Convertible Coupe 1974
 Kaiser Virginian 1950
 Kaiser Manhattan 1953
 Lincoln-Zephyr 1941
 Locomobile Model 48 Sportif 1923
 Maxwell Truck 1918
 Mercury 4-door Convertible Sedan 1940
 Mercury 2-door Sedan 1954
 Mini Coupe 1959
 Nash Motors Model 4145 Business Coupe 1941
 Oldsmobile Futuramic 88 Holiday Coupe 1950
 Oldsmobile 442 1970
 Overland Model 49 Touring Car 1911
 Overland Model 82 Touring Car 1915
 Packard Model 626 Sport Coupe 1929
 Packard Model 640 Super 8 Phaeton 1929
 Packard Model Twelve Coupe Convertible 1935
 Packard Model 120 1941
 Pierce Arrow Model 41 Limousine 1931
 Plymouth Model PB 1932
 Plymouth 2-door Coupe 1936
 Plymouth Custom Coupe 1936
 Plymouth 2-door Coupe 1939
 Plymouth Barracuda Convertible 1968
 Pontiac 4-door Sedan 1932
 Pontiac Catalina Star Chief 1955
 Pontiac Chieftain 1955
 Pontiac Catalina Custom Coupe 1960
 Pontiac GTO 1968
 Rambler Classic 770 1966
 REO the Fifth 1913
 Republic Model 19 Flatbed Truck 1919
 Stanley Model 735B Steam Car 1918
 Studebaker Commander 8 1929
 Studebaker State Commander 1938
 Studebaker Commander Starlight Coupe 1947
 Studebaker -ton Flatbed Truck 1950
 Studebaker Champion 1951
 Studebaker Golden Hawk 1957
 Studebaker Lark VIII Convertible 1960
 Studebaker Lark VIII Station Wagon 1960
 Trumbull Model 15B Roadster 1915
 Velie Model 58 5-Passenger Touring Car 1922
 Volkswagen Beetle 1964
 Volkswagen Super Beetle 1971
 Volkswagen Thing Custom 1974
 Willys-Overland Whippet 1928

Motorcycles
Motorcycles include:

 1912 Indian Model D 
 1918 Harley-Davidson 18J 
 1923 Douglas
 1923 Henderson Model K Deluxe
 1924 AJS
 1927 Harley-Davidson JD
 1933 Harley-Davidson VLE
 1937 Harley-Davidson UL
 1938 BMW R71 BY DT
 1938 Indian Four
 1942 Harley-Davidson WLA
 1947 Indian Chief
 1948 Schwinn Whizzer
 1950 Velocette MAC
 1954 Cushman Eagle with Sidecar
 1957 Vincent Series "C" Comet
 1958 Cushman 721/28 
 1958 Cushman 765 Eagle 
 1959 Cushman Super Eagle
 1963 Honda CA-110
 1964 Velocette Vogue
 1971 Velocette LE Mark III 
 1975 Moto Guzzi 850-T

See also
List of aerospace museums

References

External links

2007 establishments in Oregon
Aerospace museums in Oregon
Automobile museums in Oregon
Buildings and structures in Hood River, Oregon
Museums in Hood River County, Oregon